The Soul Man is an American comedy series created by Suzanne Martin and Cedric the Entertainer.   A spin-off of Hot in Cleveland, the series stars Cedric the Entertainer as Reverend Boyce "The Voice" Ballantine, a former R&B singer who relocates to St. Louis to become a minister. The Soul Man also stars Niecy Nash as Lolli, Boyce's wife, Jazz Raycole as their daughter Lyric, Wesley Jonathan as Boyce's younger brother "Stamps", and John Beasley as Barton, the father of Boyce and Stamps.

Twelve episodes of the series were ordered for the first season, and the pilot was made available online for a limited time on June 13, 2012. The series officially premiered on June 20, 2012. On December 13, 2012, TV Land officially picked up The Soul Man for a second season of 10 episodes. The second season premiered on June 19, 2013.

The Soul Man was renewed for a third season that consisted of eight episodes and premiered on March 26, 2014 with a special live episode. A fourth season of twelve episodes began airing on March 18, 2015 with a live episode.

, 54 episodes of The Soul Man have aired, concluding the fifth season and the series.

Series overview 
{| class="wikitable" style="text-align: center;"
|-
! style="padding: 0 8px;" colspan="2" rowspan="2"| Season
! style="padding: 0 8px;" rowspan="2"| Episodes
! colspan="2"| Originally aired 
|-
! style="padding: 0 8px;"| First aired
! Last aired
|-
 |style="background: #A92222;"|
 | 1
 | 12
 |style="padding: 0 8px;"| 
 |style="padding: 0 8px;"|  
|-
 |style="background: #db9b11;"|
 | 2
 | 10
 | 
 |  
|-
 |style="background: #244190;"|
 | 3
 | 8
 | 
 | 
 |-
 |style="background: #141414;"|
 | 4
 | 12
 | 
 | 
 |-
 |style="background: #00FF00;"|
 | 5
 | 12
 | 
 | 
|}

Episodes

Season 1 (2012)

Season 2 (2013)

Season 3 (2014)

Season 4 (2015)

Season 5 (2016)

References

External links 

 
 

Lists of American sitcom episodes